Rencia Nasson (born 7 August 1965) is a South African fencer. She competed in the women's individual foil event at the 1992 Summer Olympics.

References

External links
 

1965 births
Living people
South African female foil fencers
Olympic fencers of South Africa
Fencers at the 1992 Summer Olympics
20th-century South African women